The 1972 Rothmans International Vancouver, also known as the Vancouver WCT, was a men's professional tennis tournament that was part of the 1972 World Championship Tennis circuit. It was held on indoor carpet courts at the PNE Agrodome in Vancouver, British Columbia in Canada. It was the third edition of the tournament and was held from 15 October through 22 October 1972. First-seeded John Newcombe won the singles title and earned $10,000 first-prize money.

Finals

Singles
 John Newcombe defeated  Marty Riessen 6–7(5–7), 7–6(7–5), 7–6(14–12), 7–5
 It was Newcombe's 5th singles title of the year and the 17th of his career in the Open Era.

Doubles
 John Newcombe /  Fred Stolle defeated  Cliff Drysdale /  Allan Stone 7–6, 6–0

References

Vancouver WCT Tournament
Tennis in Canada
1972 in Canadian tennis